Bontang Football Club (formerly known as PKT Bontang or Pupuk Kaltim) is an Indonesian professional football team located in Bontang, East Kalimantan in the island of Borneo. The homebase is Mulawarman Stadium. 
Bontang FC prides itself as the most successful club to come out of Kalimantan. They were semi-finalist of the 1994-95 Liga Indonesia and finalist in 1999–2000 Liga Indonesia Premier Division. Bontang FC also build a football academy namely Diklat Mandau or PKT Junior.

History 
The club was founded as PS Pupuk Kaltim Galatama on 18 June 1988 and founded by PT Pupuk Kaltim. It went through several name changes (Pupuk Kaltim and PKT Bontang) and changes as PS Bontang PKT (abbreviation from Persatuan Sepakbola Bontang Pupuk Kalimantan Timur) in 2002. Bontang PKT was also one team in Liga Indonesia, who were never relegated from Divisi Utama Liga Indonesia. It also made some appearances in Asian Winners Cup and it was the first ever and last made by a club from Kalimantan. This club changed to currently name (Bontang FC) on 12 June 2009.

Match-fixing scandal 
In 2013 the club was involved in the match fixing scandal in the event the Indonesian Premier League play-off during a game against PSLS Lhokseumawe club who were also involved in the scandal. It was revealed after FIFA suspicion over the outcome of the game was not fair, an indication of match fixing is known by FIFA through the Early warning system (EWS) which owned them. Therefore, after doing a thorough investigation over the last two months, the discipline committee of the Indonesia FA finally sentenced to ban all club players from playing in Indonesia football competition for two years and their coach Fodé Camara from Guinea was punished by not permitting their involvement in Indonesian football lifetime life, as well as an official team also receiving a five-year sentence. While the club was barred from the league for two years and relegated to the lowest caste competition in Indonesia Third Division and a fine of IDR 100 million.

Crest

Performance in AFC competitions

References

External links
 Bontang PKT Official Site
 Goal.com Profile

Bontang F.C.
Football clubs in Indonesia
Football clubs in East Kalimantan
1988 establishments in Indonesia
Association football clubs established in 1988